Tom Rand is a British costume designer most known for his work in films such as The Count of Monte Cristo and The French Lieutenant's Woman.

He received an Academy Award nomination for The French Lieutenant's Woman in the category of Best Costumes during the 54th Academy Awards.

In 2011 he appeared on the British documentary TV show Timeshift.

Filmography

The Count of Monte Cristo (2002)
Un pont entre deux rives (The Bridge) (1999)
Only Love (1998)
Innocent Lies (1995)
A Business Affair (1994)
Princess Caraboo (1994)
Heart of Darkness (1993)
The Temp (1993)
The Power of One (1992)
Strike It Rich (1990)
Young Toscanini (1988)
Eleni (1985)
The Shooting Party (1985)
The Pirates of Penzance (1983)
The French Lieutenant's Woman (1981)
The Duellists (1977)

References

External links

Living people
Year of birth missing (living people)
British costume designers